Muharrem Korhan Yamaç (born October 31, 1972, in Edirne, Turkey) is a Paralympics, world and European champion disabled sport shooter from Turkey competing in the air pistol events of 10m, 25m and 50m.

He was an army officer at the rank of a lieutenant as he stepped onto a land mine and lost his right foot.

Yamaç competed at the 2004 Summer Paralympics winning a gold and a bronze medal. At the 2008 Summer Paralympics, he was the flagbearer of his nation.

He won gold, silver and bronze medals at world and European events. He qualified again for his third time participation at the Summer Paralympics.

Achievements

References

1972 births
Sportspeople from Edirne
Paralympic shooters of Turkey
Shooters at the 2004 Summer Paralympics
Shooters at the 2008 Summer Paralympics
Paralympic gold medalists for Turkey
Paralympic bronze medalists for Turkey
Living people
Paralympic silver medalists for Turkey
Shooters at the 2012 Summer Paralympics
Turkish Army officers
Medalists at the 2004 Summer Paralympics
Medalists at the 2012 Summer Paralympics
Paralympic medalists in shooting
Shooters at the 2016 Summer Paralympics
Shooters at the 2020 Summer Paralympics